The 1992 Dutch Open was an ATP men's tennis tournament staged in Hilversum, Netherlands that was part of the World Series of the 1992 ATP Tour. The tournament was held from 20 July until 26 July 1992. Czechoslovakia's Karel Nováček, who was seeded third, won his first individual title of the year, and eighth of his career.

Finals

Singles

 Karel Nováček defeated  Jordi Arrese 6–2, 6–3, 2–6, 7–5

Doubles

 Paul Haarhuis /  Mark Koevermans defeated  Mårten Renström /  Mikael Tillström, 6–7, 6–1, 6–4

References

 
Dutch Open (tennis)
Dutch Open
Dutch Open (tennis), 1992